The Karnataka State Film Awards 1996–97, presented by Government of Karnataka, to felicitate the best of Kannada Cinema released in the year 1996.

Lifetime achievement award

Jury 

A committee headed by G. V. Iyer was appointed to evaluate the awards.

Film Awards

Other Awards

References

Karnataka State Film Awards